Sean David Morton is a self-described psychic, ufologist and alleged remote viewer who has referred to himself as "America's Prophet." Until legal troubles led to his incarceration in a federal prison, he also hosted radio shows, authored books, and made documentary films about the paranormal. In 2010, Morton and his wife were charged with civil securities fraud. The director of the New York regional office of the U.S. Securities and Exchange Commission (SEC) stated that "Morton's self-proclaimed psychic powers were nothing more than a scam to attract investors and steal their money." In 2016, Morton and his wife were indicted on Federal tax-related charges, and were found guilty in April 2017. He served a Federal prison sentence.

Early life
Morton spent his early years in Texas and high school years in Atherton, California where he attended Woodside High School, graduating in the class of 1976. He alleges he was sent to a military school as well. He attended University of Southern California, graduating with a Bachelor of Arts in Political Science and a Bachelor of Fine Arts in Performing Arts. His father was a public relations official for TRW, and his mother was radio/TV personality and health author Maureen Kennedy Salaman. Both parents were fundamentalist Christians but Morton became a self-described "New Age thinker". He has said that as a child he often heard astronauts describe their experiences with extraterrestrials. Although he claims to have had extensive contact with astronauts in his childhood, in later life Morton alleged that the National Aeronautics and Space Administration was "fake."

Morton became interested in the paranormal after a 1985 trip to England and Ireland where he became involved in what he calls either the Green Stone saga or the Meonia Stone saga. He later went to India where he met with the Dalai Lama. Morton claims that while in India, he was taught the secrets of astral time travel by Nepalese monks and that they also helped him to develop a system of remote viewing. However, Morton is a well-known charlatan, liar and con artist, who has never shown any proof of his claims to have developed such abilities.

Doctorate
Morton uses the title "Doctor" in formal situations such as conference presentations. The Aquarian Radio website says he received his Ph.D. in therapeutic psychology from the International Institute of Health and Spiritual Sciences in Montreal, Canada, in 2005. Also known as the International College of Spiritual & Psychic Sciences, this institution offers a four-part curriculum. The "Level V program", claimed to be the equivalent of a doctorate, requires 120 graduate credits for a fee of $40 CAN per credit.

Work

Between 1985 and 1996, Morton produced documentaries on subjects including the Chupacabra and Bigfoot. He also led tours around Area 51. Morton suggested that aliens from Area 51 were from "Krondac," a planet 800 light-years away. 

Morton was the subject of an article by the website UFO Watchdog, "The Shameless Psychic and His Prophecy of Lies", which threw doubt on many of Morton's claims.  Morton filed a lawsuit against the site for libel but the case was dismissed.

Morton also conducted workshops based on sovereign citizen ideology, in which he claimed that Americans could "emancipate" themselves from the Federal government and promoted means to wipe out mortgages, tax bills and student loans.

Securities fraud charges 
From 1996 to 2010, Morton ran Delphi Associates Newsletter (DAN), a print and online publication in which he made economic, financial and political predictions. In 2001, Morton predicted that the Dow Jones Industrial Average would rise to somewhere around 12,000 in December. The index actually ended at 8,341. In 2007, he founded The Delphi Investment Group to allow investors to profit from trading in world currencies based on his predictions.

On March 7, 2010, Morton and his wife Melissa were charged with civil securities fraud. He is alleged to have defrauded around 100 customers of $6 million between 2006 and 2007. According to the SEC, only a fraction of the money received by Morton went into foreign exchange trading accounts, with the rest diverted to shell companies run by Morton and his wife.

In 2009, Morton attempted to file suit against the SEC for harassment, but the suit was dismissed.

In February 2013, Morton was ordered by a judge to pay $11.5 million to the SEC within 14 days.

U.S. Federal criminal tax convictions
Morton and his wife Melissa were arrested on January 31, 2016 after being charged with 51 counts of issuing false instruments, 4 counts of filing false federal income tax documents, and one count of conspiracy to defraud the Internal Revenue Service (IRS).  The latter charge originated because the Mortons filed several tax returns claiming refunds due on non-existent overpayments. In one such case the IRS failed to cross-check sufficiently and actually issued a check for $480,323, which the Mortons immediately transferred into other accounts. They faced up to 650 and 625 years in federal prison, respectively. On April 7, 2017, Sean and Melissa Morton were found guilty of 51 charges by a Federal court jury. The jury gave its verdict after only two hours. Sentencing was set for June 19, 2017.

The sentencing for Melissa Morton had been re-set for August 21, 2017. Sean David Morton failed to appear for his June 19 sentencing hearing. A federal arrest warrant was issued immediately. On August 21, 2017, Morton and his wife were arrested and taken into custody.

On September 18, 2017, Sean David Morton was sentenced to six years in prison, and was ordered to pay $480,322 in restitution to the Internal Revenue Service. The Court also ordered supervised release for five years after Mortons prison term, with the condition that he "shall not engage . . . in any business involving the sale of financial instruments or providing debt relief services .  . . ." On the same day, Melissa Morton was sentenced to two years in prison with similar conditions regarding post-release supervision, and she was ordered to pay the same restitution amount to the Internal Revenue Service.

Sean David Morton was released from prison in 2021. Melissa Morton completed her term at the Federal Correctional Institution at Victorville, California.

Media appearances
1992 UFOs and the Alien Presence
1997 Area 51: The Alien Interview
2006 Fastwalkers
2010 Metaphysia 2012
2011 Apocalypse According to Doris
2012 New Humanity
2012 Beyond the Edge
2012 Ancient Aliens 
2013 UFO Chronicles

Publications

References

External links

Strange Universe Radio
How Sovereign Citizens Helped Swindle $1 Billion From the Government They Disavow --New York Times By Ashley Powers March 29, 2019

1959 births
Living people
University of Southern California alumni
Writers from California
Radio personalities from California
American psychics
American fraudsters
American investors
American investment advisors
Ufologists
Sovereign citizen movement individuals